William Arnold Lynch (August 4, 1844 – February 6, 1907) was an Ohio lawyer and politician.

Lynch was born in Canton, Ohio, USA in 1844, the son of Arnold Lynch and Frances (Horan) Lynch.  Lynch's parents, both Irish immigrants, had moved to Ohio in their young adulthood. Arnold Lynch was employed as a surveyor and later held office as county surveyor and recorder of deeds. Arnold Lynch died in 1857, when his son was thirteen years old. William Lynch attended the public schools in Canton and graduated at the age of sixteen.  He studied the law at a local attorney's office and was admitted to the bar in 1865. The next year, Lynch ran as a Democrat for the office of prosecuting attorney of the county and was elected. Lynch was appointed city solicitor of Canton the same year, holding both offices simultaneously. After completing a two-year term, he was defeated for reelection by his Republican opponent, future U.S. President William McKinley.  Lynch was renominated in 1870, facing off again against McKinley, and was narrowly elected.

Lynch did not seek reelection in 1872, instead starting a private practice with William R. Day, the future Supreme Court justice. In 1874, he married Eliza Underhill, with whom he had three daughters. The next year, 1875, Day and Lynch faced off against McKinley in court, the two partners representing a group of coal mine owners, and McKinley representing a group of striking miners. The case involved charges the miners rioted when confronted with strikebreakers, but only one man was convicted. Lynch's brother, Austin, joined the firm in 1878, which then became known as Lynch, Day, and Lynch. William Lynch resigned from the partnership in 1882, but the firm continued and is the predecessor of the Canton, Ohio firm Day Ketterer, which still exists.

After leaving private practice, Lynch was exclusively employed working for railroad interests, including the Connotton Valley Railroad and the Pittsburgh, Akron & Western Railroad. He also was among the owners of the Canton and Massilon Electric Railway, an intercity line. After McKinley's assassination in 1901, Lynch was one of the founders of the McKinley National Memorial Association, which was responsible for the construction of the McKinley National Memorial. From 1903 to 1906, he served as a city councilman in Canton. He practiced law up to his final day, February 6, 1907, when he died in the middle of a trial in Lisbon, Ohio.

References

Sources
 
 

1844 births
1907 deaths
Politicians from Canton, Ohio
Ohio city council members
Ohio lawyers
American people of Irish descent
Lawyers from Canton, Ohio
Burials at West Lawn Cemetery
19th-century American politicians